Eastwood is an English surname originally derived from the Old English words east and wudu, meaning "eastwood". The family would have originally lived to the east of a wood, in an eastern wood or in a place called Eastwood.  According to one account, Eastwood was an English landed gentry family originating from Nottingham, to which belonged the mayor of Dublin in the Seventeenth Century, during the reign of Charles II.

Notable people sharing the surname "Eastwood" 

 Alice Eastwood
 Alison Eastwood
 Arthur Eastwood, New Zealand rower
 Bob Eastwood
 Clint Eastwood, American film director, actor, producer, screenwriter, musician and composer
 Colum Eastwood (born 1983), Northern Irish politician
 Dina Eastwood
 Francesca Fisher-Eastwood
 Freddy Eastwood (born 1983), Welsh international footballer
 Greg Eastwood, New Zealand rugby league footballer
 Jayne Eastwood
 Jim Eastwood, Northern Irish businessman
 John S. Eastwood
 Kathy Eastwood, American astronomer
 Ken Eastwood
 Kyle Eastwood
Mark Eastwood, British politician
 Mike Eastwood, NHL ice hockey player
 Paul Eastwood, British rugby league footballer
 Ralph Eastwood, British army general during World War II
 Scott Eastwood, American actor and son of Clint Eastwood
 Simon Eastwood (born 1989), English footballer
 Sorcha Eastwood (born 1986), Northern Irish politician
 Tom Eastwood (1922–1999), English composer

References 

English toponymic surnames
English-language surnames
Surnames of English origin